Joan Lyn Slonczewski is an American microbiologist at Kenyon College and a science fiction writer who explores biology and space travel. Their books have twice earned the John W. Campbell Memorial Award for Best Science Fiction Novel: A Door into Ocean (1987) and The Highest Frontier (2011). With John W. Foster and Erik Zinser, they coauthor the textbook, Microbiology: An Evolving Science (W. W. Norton) now in its fifth edition. They explore ideas of biology, politics, and artificial intelligence at their blog Ultraphyte.

Biography
Slonczewski was born in 1956 at Hyde Park, New York and raised in Katonah, New York.

They earned an A.B. in biology, magna cum laude, from Bryn Mawr College in 1977. They completed a PhD in Molecular Biophysics and Biochemistry from Yale University in 1982 and post-doctoral work at the University of Pennsylvania studying calcium flux in leukocyte chemotaxis. Since 1984 they have taught at Kenyon College, taking sabbatical leaves at Princeton University and the University of Maryland, Baltimore. Slonczewski's research focuses on the pH (environmental) stress response in Escherichia coli and Bacillus subtilis using genetic techniques.

Slonczewski teaches both biology and science fiction courses. From 1996 through 2008, they have been awarded Howard Hughes Medical Institute funding for undergraduate biological sciences education, which they use to improve science instruction and to foster summer science fellowships for minority and first-generation students.

They were the Hal Clement Science Speaker in February 2011 at the Boskone 48 convention.
  
Slonczewski is also a member of the Quakers and Quakerism is featured in many of their novels.

Fiction
Their 1986 Campbell Award-winning novel A Door into Ocean shows their command of genetics and ecological science, as well as their commitment to pacifism and feminism. It depicts the ecosystem of a planet covered entirely by water, inhabited by an exclusively female race of genetic engineers. Daughters of Elysium (1993), The Children Star (1998), and Brain Plague (2000) are loose sequels.

A serialization of their The Children Star (1998) appeared in Analog Science Fiction and Fact, a magazine known for hard science fiction.

Brain Plague (2000) depicts a world where intelligent microbes inhabit human brains.  The microbial aliens have potential for great good as well as great evil. They evolve in the same way as pathogens such as HIV or as symbionts such as our digestive bacteria, which help keep humans healthy. Brain Plague tells of a future in which genetic engineering, combined with nanotechnology, can do everything from shaping our bodies to growing enormous buildings for us. "One time in class, my students were discussing my book Brain Plague. I asked the class, 'Is this book liberal or conservative?' A student said, 'It's conservative, because all the characters are married.' Another student jumped up, 'It is not conservative!' Half the book's marriages are gay – with a few robots included."—the author.

The Highest Frontier (2011) is a coming of age story about the first year in college of Jennifer Ramos Kennedy, a member of the ongoing Kennedy political dynasty.   The year is 2108 and Jenny is attending Frontera College, which is located in a space habitation.  The earth is being destroyed by human-made ecological catastrophes blamed on the "ultraphytes," UV-photosynthetic plant-animals from outer space. Some political factions are promoting space habitats as a solution, but the spacehabs can only accommodate a tiny percentage of the human population. The political system is grid locked. The Highest Frontier addresses political, social, and environmental issues.

Mitochondrial Singularity
Slonczewski invented the concept of the Mitochondrial Singularity, the idea that the technological singularity is happening gradually; that humans are gradually becoming the "mitochondria of our own machines." They explore these concepts in their novels Brain Plague and The Highest Frontier.

Bibliography

Novels
 Still Forms on Foxfield (1980) 1988 reprint 
 A Door into Ocean (1986) 
 The Wall Around Eden (1989) 
 Daughter of Elysium (1993) 
 The Children Star (1998) 
 Brain Plague (2000) 
 The Highest Frontier (2011)

Science publications
 J. L. Slonczewski, John W. Foster and Erik Zinser, 2020, Microbiology: An Evolving Science 5E, a core microbiology textbook for undergraduate science majors, W. W. Norton & Co., New York.

Awards
 Robert Tomsich Award, for outstanding achievement in research in science, Kenyon College, 2001.
 Silver Medalist, National Professor of the Year program, Council for the Advancement and Support of Education, Washington DC, 1989.
 John W. Campbell Memorial Award for Best Science Fiction Novel, A Door into Ocean, 1987.
 John W. Campbell Memorial Award for Best Science Fiction Novel, The Highest Frontier, 2012.

References

External links 

Joan Slonczewski site
Ultraphyte author blog
Illustrated guide to A Door into Ocean
Joan Slonczewski paper on Bacteriology
Joan Slonczewski selected as Keynote Speaker for Science and Science Fiction Conference
 
Making Strange Stuff Familiar: A Conversation with Joan Slonczewski (interview) at Clarkesworld Magazine, 10/2011
Joan Slonczewski: Field of Discovery, Interview at Locus magazine, March 2014

1956 births
20th-century American novelists
21st-century American novelists
American science fiction writers
American women novelists
Women science fiction and fantasy writers
American pacifists
American Quakers
American feminist writers
Bryn Mawr College alumni
Kenyon College faculty
Living people
American microbiologists
University of Pennsylvania alumni
American women biologists
Women microbiologists
Yale University alumni
People from Hyde Park, New York
People from Katonah, New York
People from Gambier, Ohio
20th-century American women writers
21st-century American women writers
Activists from Ohio
Activists from New York (state)
Novelists from Ohio
Scientists from New York (state)
Quaker feminists
American women academics